Phtheochroa procerana is a species of moth of the family Tortricidae. It is found in Bulgaria, Hungary, Romania and Turkey.

The wingspan is 14–16 mm. Adults have been recorded on wing from June to July.

References

Moths described in 1863
Phtheochroa